The men's 400 metres hurdles event at the 2020 Summer Olympics took place between 30 July and 3 August 2021 at the Olympic Stadium. 36 athletes from 26 nations competed.

In what has been described as one of the greatest races in Olympic history, Karsten Warholm of Norway won, setting a new world record of 45.94 seconds. He beat his own previous record, set a month before, by 0.76 seconds; silver medalist Rai Benjamin of the United States beat the previous record by 0.53 seconds. Brazilian hurdler Alison dos Santos took bronze and would have bettered the almost 30-year-old Olympic record in the final by 0.06 seconds. The medals were the first ever in the event for both Norway and Brazil; the United States' podium streak in the event stretched to four Games.

Summary
Following more than a decade of dominance by Edwin Moses, Kevin Young set the world record at 46.78 in the 1992 Olympic Final, being the first man to break 47 seconds (Moses' best time had been 47.02).

The 47-second barrier would not be broken again until 2018, by Abderrahman Samba, then in 2019, Karsten Warholm and Rai Benjamin broke it in the same race.

In 2021 at the United States Olympic Trials, Benjamin narrowly missed Young's world record, and a week later, Warholm broke it, stopping the clock at 46.70. It was expected it would take a world record to win the Olympic gold medal.

Both Benjamin and Warholm drew each other in the first semifinal: Warholm sped up at the finish to take the win in 47.30, while Alison dos Santos ran 47.31 to win the second semifinal over Samba.

In the final, Warholm started quickly, gaining a slight advantage over the first barrier. One lane to his inside, Benjamin was able to see the position of his opponent. By the fifth hurdle, Warholm had a half a stride advantage, but through the final turn, Benjamin pulled that back in steadily.

Benjamin, with the momentum, cleared the final hurdle even with Warholm, but Warholm opened up in the 40 metre dash to the finish line, winning by two metres.

Warholm's time was 45.94 - breaking the 46-second barrier - and also demolishing his existing world record by 0.76 seconds. Benjamin ran 46.17, more than half a second faster than the previous world record, to win silver, and bronze medalist dos Santos ran 46.72, just 0.02 slower than Warholm's previous world record. If not for Warholm's performance, Benjamin's time would have been the greatest improvement in this event's world record since 1968. Warholm's new record improved his previous record by 1.6%, the largest improvement by percentage in a men's track world record since Michael Johnson lowered the 200m world record by 1.7% in 1996. Also, using World Athletics scoring tables in an attempt to compare the quality of Warholm's performance to other men's track world records, the only world-record performances superior to that of Warholm were Usain Bolt's records in the 100m and 200m.

The all-time list saw Young move down to No. 4 as all three broke his Olympic record; further to this, all three medalists broke their respective continental records, six of the eight competitors in the race set new national records, and all eight finalists recorded the best times in history for their respective placements in the race.

This race was one of the few times in which all three medalists broke the existing Olympic record and the top two finishers also broke the existing world record; and the same outcome occurred in the women's 400m hurdles final the next day.

Background

This was the 27th appearance of the event, which was introduced in 1900. It was left off the 1912 program, but has been contested at every Games since the post-World War I return of the Olympics in 1920.

The reigning world champion was Karsten Warholm of Norway. The reigning Olympic champion Kerron Clement of the United States did not compete.

The British Virgin Islands competed in the men's 400 metres hurdles for the first time. The United States made its 26th appearance, most of any nation, having missed only the boycotted 1980 Games.

Qualification

Approximately forty athletes were expected to compete; the exact number depended on how many nations used universality places to enter athletes in addition to the 40 qualifying through time or ranking (1 universality place was used in 2016).

A National Olympic Committee (NOC) could enter up to 3 qualified athletes in the men's 400 metres hurdles event if all athletes met the entry standard or qualified by ranking during the qualifying period. (The limit of 3 had been in place since the 1930 Olympic Congress.) The qualifying standard was 48.90 seconds. This standard was "set for the sole purpose of qualifying athletes with exceptional performances unable to qualify through the IAAF World Rankings pathway." The world rankings, based on the average of the best five results for the athlete over the qualifying period and weighted by the importance of the meet, was used thereafter to qualify athletes until the cap of 40 is reached.

The qualifying period was originally from 1 May 2019 to 29 June 2020. Due to the COVID-19 pandemic, the period was suspended from 6 April 2020 to 30 November 2020, with the end date extended to 29 June 2021. The world rankings period start date was also changed from 1 May 2019 to 30 June 2020. Athletes who had met the qualifying standard during that time were still qualified, but those using world rankings would not be able to count performances during that time. The qualifying time standards could be obtained in various meets during the given period that have the approval of the IAAF. Only outdoor meets were eligible. The most recent Area Championships could be counted in the ranking, even if they didn't take place during the qualifying period.

NOCs could also use their universality place—each NOC could enter one male athlete regardless of time if they had no male athletes meeting the entry standard for an athletics event—in the 400 metres hurdles.

Entry number: 40.

Competition format

The event continued to use the three-round format used previously in every Games since 1908 (except for a four-round competition in 1952).

Records

Prior to this competition, the existing World, Olympic, and Area records were as follows:

New records
The following new World and Olympic records were set during this competition:

The following new Area (continental) records were set during this competition:

The following national records were set during this competition:

Schedule

All times are Japan Standard Time (UTC+9)

The men's 400 metres hurdles took place over three separate days.

Results

Round 1

Qualification rule: first 4 of each heat (Q) plus the 4 fastest times (q) qualified.

Heat 1

Heat 2

Heat 3

Heat 4

Heat 5

Semifinals 
Qualification rule: first 2 of each heat (Q) plus the 2 fastest times (q) qualified.

Semifinal 1

Semifinal 2

Semifinal 3

Final

References

Men's 400 metres hurdles
2020
Men's events at the 2020 Summer Olympics